Daiji-ji (大慈寺), also known as Daijizen-ji (大慈禅寺), is a Sōtō Zen Buddhist temple in Minami-ku, Kumamoto, Japan.

History
The temple was founded in 1278 by Kangan Giin with support of Kawashiri Yasuaki (川尻泰明), the local chief. Kangan Giin, a disciple of Dōgen and the founder of the Higo school of Sōtō Zen Buddhism. It has long been known as the leading Sōtō Zen temple in Kyushu. The local scenery resembles that of Dàbēi shān (大慈山) in Mingzhou now Ningbo, China, where Giin practiced Zen Buddhism discipline. 

This temple has since been destroyed twice in the fire caused by war, and nothing of Giin's remains remain there. The current buildings are the Edo-period Hondō dating to 1779.

Important Cultural Properties
The bronze bell, a 169 centimeter tall inside the main gate was built in 1269.

References

External links
Vol.12 Temple Daijiji - Sotozen-net 

Religious buildings and structures completed in 1278
Soto temples
Buddhist temples in Kumamoto Prefecture
Buildings and structures in Kumamoto
Tourist attractions in Kumamoto Prefecture
1270s establishments in Japan
1278 establishments in Asia